Bohdan Warchal (27 January 1930 in Orlová, Czechoslovakia – 30 December 2000 in Bratislava, Slovakia) was a Slovak violinist, a member of the Slovak Philharmonic Orchestra and founder, chief conductor and soloist of the Slovak Chamber Orchestra.

His Naxos Records discography includes the Bach Brandenburg Concerti and Handel's Water and Fireworks Music. For cpo he has recorded many of Michael Haydn's symphonies.

Positions
 1957–1964 - concertmaster of the Slovak Philharmonic Orchestra
 1964 - artistic leader of the Slovak Chamber Orchestra
 1959–1963 - external pedagogue at the State Conservatory Bratislava
 1980 - pedagogue at the Academy of Performing Arts in Bratislava
 1995 - moved from the Slovak Philharmonic Orchestra to the Prague Chamber Orchestra
 1997 - became the leader of the Slovak Chamber Orchestra again

See also
 The 100 Greatest Slovak Albums of All Time

External links
Naxos biography
Osobnosti.sk biography 

1930 births
2000 deaths
Slovak musicians
Slovak conductors (music)
Male conductors (music)
Slovak violinists
People from Orlová
20th-century conductors (music)
20th-century violinists
20th-century male musicians